The Suke mine is one of the largest nickel mines in Kosovo. The mine is located in Glogovac in Pristina district. The mine has reserves amounting to 0.63 million tonnes of ore grading 1.36% nickel, 0.06% copper, 30.56% iron, 49.17% silica and 9.48% magnesite thus resulting 8,600 tonnes of nickel, 378 tonnes of copper, 192,500 tonnes of iron, 309,800 tonnes of silica and 59,700 tonnes of magnesite.

References

External links
Official website

Nickel mines in Kosovo